The Europe Zone was one of the three regional zones of the 1985 Davis Cup.

27 teams entered the Europe Zone in total, split across two sub-zones. The winner of each sub-zone was promoted to the following year's World Group.

Denmark defeated Romania in the Zone A final, and Great Britain defeated Israel in the Zone B final, resulting in both Denmark and Great Britain being promoted to the 1986 World Group.

Participating nations
Zone A: 

Zone B:

Zone A

Draw

First round

Morocco vs. Hungary

Egypt vs. Algeria

Senegal vs. Monaco

Cyprus vs. Ireland

Belgium vs. Bulgaria

Quarterfinals

Turkey vs. Romania

Egypt vs. Hungary

Monaco vs. Ireland

Denmark vs. Belgium

Semifinals

Romania vs. Egypt

Monaco vs. Denmark

Final

Romania vs. Denmark

Zone B

Draw

First round

Netherlands vs. Finland

Greece vs. Norway

Poland vs. Zimbabwe

Tunisia vs. Switzerland

Portugal vs. Luxembourg

Quarterfinals

Israel vs. Netherlands

Greece vs. Austria

Switzerland vs. Zimbabwe

Great Britain vs. Portugal

Semifinals

Austria vs. Israel

Great Britain vs. Switzerland

Final

Great Britain vs. Israel

References

External links
Davis Cup official website

Davis Cup Europe/Africa Zone
Europe Zone